The Ancient World
Ancient Furniture
Pottery of Ancient Greece
Arts of Caucasian Albania
The Byzantine Empire
Macedonian art
The Antique and Medieval Asian World
Chinese ceramics
Japanese Pottery
Korean Pottery

The Arts of Islam
Islamic pottery
Persian rug
Azerbaijani rug
Renaissance Europe
Cassone
Orientalism in early modern France

18th-century Europe
Adam Style
Carpet
Neoclassicism
Rococo

19th-century Europe
Arts and Crafts movement
Biedermeier
Egyptian Revival
Empire Style
Greek Revival & Neo-Grec
Renaissance Revival
Rococo Revival
Victorian decorative arts

20th-century Europe
 Art Nouveau
 Art Deco
 Bauhaus

United States
 American Fancy
 American craft & American Craftsman

See also
Applied art
Decorative art
Furniture
Furnishings

Decorative
Decorative arts